
Boys Town or Boystown may refer to:

Places
 Boystown, Chicago, a gay village in the Lakeview neighborhood of Chicago, Illinois, USA
 Boystown, County Wicklow, a civil parish in County Wicklow, Ireland
 Boys Town, Nebraska, a suburb of Omaha, Nebraska, USA, and the headquarters of the Boys Town organization
 Boy's Town (prostitution), a district in a Mexican border city that is formally designated for legalized prostitution
 Boyztown, a gay red-light district in Pattaya, Thailand
 Boy's Town, Wayanad, India

Schools
 Boys' Town (Engadine), a residential school for boys with behavioural issues in Engadine, New South Wales, Australia
 Boys Town Jerusalem, an Orthodox Jewish orphanage and educational institution in Jerusalem, Israel

Sports
 Boys' Town F.C., a Jamaican football club.
 Boys' Town Cricket Club, a Jamaican football club in the capital Kingston.

Media
 Boys Town (film), a 1938 film about Father Flanagan and his work, starring Spencer Tracy and Mickey Rooney, with Henry Hull and Leslie Fenton
 Boystown (film), an unrelated 2007 Spanish comedy film

Organizations and commerce
 Boys Town (organization), an organization dedicated to the housing and education of at-risk children, founded by Father Edward J. Flanagan
 Boystown (website), an illegal child pornography website

See also
 Girls Town (disambiguation)